Maksymilian Rozwandowicz (born 18 June 1994) is a Polish professional footballer who plays as a defensive midfielder for Zagłębie Sosnowiec.

References

Polish footballers
1994 births
Living people
Association football midfielders
Widzew Łódź players
Chrobry Głogów players
ŁKS Łódź players
Zagłębie Sosnowiec players
Ekstraklasa players
I liga players
II liga players
III liga players